Natacha Maes (born 15 March 1965 in Watermael-Boitsfort) is a racing cyclist who was born in Watermael-Boitsfort, Belgium and lives in Lancing, Sussex. She became the Belgian National Road Race Champion in 2004. She has competed in many international events including the Tour de l'Aude as part of the Belgian national team in 2005.

Palmarès

2000
2nd Belgian National Time Trial Championships (BEL)
1st CTT Circuit Time Trial Championships (GBR)
4th 25 mile, CTT National Time Trial Championships (GBR)

2001
2nd 25 mile, CTT National Time Trial Championships (GBR)

2002
2nd Wielsbeke (BEL)

2004
1st  Belgian National Time Trial Championships
1st  Belgian National Road Race Championships

2005
1st  Belgian National Time Trial Championships
2nd Burcht (BEL)
1st Passendale (BEL)
1st Steenokkerzeel (BEL)

References

1965 births
Living people
People from Watermael-Boitsfort
Belgian female cyclists
People from Lancing, West Sussex
Cyclists from Brussels
21st-century Belgian women